Ebrahim Zand  (1888-1974) was an Iranian politician.  

Zand received his primary education in Tehran and went to Russia to continue his education. He entered the St. Petersburg School of Law and received a college degree there. In 1920, after returning to Iran, he entered the State Department. He became the Director General of the Ministry of Agriculture and was appointed 5 times no less as Minister of War. Between 1950 and 1951, he was the governor of Bank Melli Iran, Iran's central bank at that time. Then he served as governor of Isfahan, and was succeeded in this post by Mohammad Ali Keshavarz Sadr. 

He was also the Iranian ambassador to Turkey, Italy and Spain.

References

20th-century Iranian diplomats
1888 births
1974 deaths
Iranian governors
Government ministers of Iran
Iranian bankers
Central bankers
Ambassadors of Iran to Turkey
Ambassadors of Iran to Italy
Ambassadors of Iran to Spain
People of Pahlavi Iran